Tourtellotte is a surname. Notable people with the surname include:

John E. Tourtellotte (1869–1939), American architect
Suzanne W. Tourtellotte (1945–2013), American astronomer